Des Adam (born 9 September 1945 in Perth, Ontario) served as the second mayor of Kanata, Ontario from 1985 to 1991.

Adam served for two terms as mayor until he was defeated by Merle Nicholds in the 12 November 1991 municipal election. He currently remains in the community working as a real estate lawyer, and serving as the deacon at St. Isidore parish.

References

1945 births
Living people
Mayors of Kanata
People from Perth, Ontario